Mladen "Maho" Aleksandrov Vasilev (born 29 July 1947, in Slivnitsa) is a former Bulgarian football player, and later coach.

Career
Born in Slivnitsa, Vasilev started his career with local side Slivnishki Geroy. Later he played for PFC Slavia Sofia (1968–1969), and Akademik Sofia (1969–1977, 209 times and 68 goals).

He played for Bulgaria national football team, including the 1974 FIFA World Cup in West Germany.

External links
 Mladen Vasilev in Slivnitsa.com
 

1947 births
Living people
Bulgarian footballers
1974 FIFA World Cup players
Bulgaria international footballers
Akademik Sofia players
PFC Slavia Sofia players
First Professional Football League (Bulgaria) players
Association football forwards